Vladimir Sotnikov (born 19 June 2004) is a Russian Paralympic swimmer. In 2020, he won bronze in the 100 metre backstroke S13 at the 2020 Summer Paralympics held in Tokyo, Japan.

References

Living people
2004 births
Swimmers at the 2020 Summer Paralympics
Medalists at the 2020 Summer Paralympics
Paralympic medalists in swimming
Paralympic gold medalists for the Russian Paralympic Committee athletes
Paralympic bronze medalists for the Russian Paralympic Committee athletes
Russian male backstroke swimmers
Russian male freestyle swimmers
Russian male medley swimmers
S13-classified Paralympic swimmers